A stone-boat is a type of sled (sledge) for moving heavy objects such as stones or hay bales. Originally they were for animal-powered transport used with horses or oxen to clear fields of stones and other uses and may still be used with animals or tractors today
.

The device may look like a low-profile sled with timber runners or have a flat bottom of planks secured together to slide over soft ground or snow.  Originally  made of wood,  metal versions exist with hinges.

References 	

Animal-powered vehicles